is a city located in Yamaguchi Prefecture, Japan. As of May 1, 2016, the city has an estimated population of 25,857 and a population density of 54.70 persons per km2. The total area is 472.71 km2.

History 
The city was founded on March 31, 1954 by a merger of municipalities that departed from Mine District (Mine-gun). 
On March 21, 2008, Mine absorbed the rest of Mine District, which consisted of towns Mitō and  Shūhō, while the newly merged city retained the name, Mine.

Geography

Climate
Mine has a humid subtropical climate (Köppen climate classification Cfa) with hot summers and cool winters. Precipitation is significant throughout the year, but is much higher in summer than in winter.

Demographics
Per Japanese census data, the population of Mine in 2020 is 23,247 people. Mine has been conducting censuses since 1920.

Attractions

Akiyoshidai is served by a natural history museum, visitor center, rest house, youth hostel and park headquarters building, and is traversed by a scenic roadway and several walking trails. Events include a fireworks festival in July, a “Karst Walk” in November, and an annual burning off of dry grasses in February called “Yamayaki”. Akiyoshidai Quasi-National Park is situated within the Mine-Akiyoshidai Karst Plateau Geopark.
 Akiyoshido, . Towards the southern end of Akiyoshidai is the  Akiyoshido cave, named by Emperor Hirohito on May 30, 1926 when he was still crown prince.  This spacious cave is up to 100 meters wide and has 8.79 kilometers of passages, making it the longest in Japan and one of the longest in Asia.  At the present time an approximately one-kilometer-long section of the cave is open to the public as a sightseeing course, with a walkway and bridge system, entering at the cave's lowest point and exiting via an artificial elevator. This portion of the cave is also well decorated with a variety of large and colorful speleothems.
 Mine-Akiyoshidai Karst Plateau Geopark

Geology

Subsequent erosion has created an undulating karst landscape dimpled with many dolines and countless limestone pinnacles up to two meters in height. Beneath the surface lie hundreds of caves, a few of them quite significant geologically.

Numerous fossils of Pleistocene age  have been found in these caves, including those of the Japanese rhinoceros, Stegodont elephant, Naumann elephant, Young tiger, and numerous other animals from the last interglacial period.

The area around Akiyoshidai was once heavily forested about 500,000 years ago. In the Jōmon period, the area served as a hunting ground and the bottoms of sinkholes as vegetable fields. Numerous Paleolithic artifacts have been recovered. As farming began in Japan, the local people eventually replaced the forested landscape with Japanese pampas grass for feeding their animals and thatching houses. Repeated cycles of burning the grass have kept trees from growing back since.

Transportation

Trains
West Japan Railway Company(JR Nishi Nihon) stations
Mine Line
Atsu Station
Shirōgahara Station
Minami-Ōmine Station
Mine Station
Shigeyasu Station
Ofuku Station

Roads

Expressway
Chūgoku Expressway
Mine Interchange
Mine-nishi Interchange

Notable people from Mine
Sekinari Nii, former governor of Yamaguchi Prefecture
Mayu Iwatani, acclaimed professional wrestler with World Wonder Ring Stardom and Ring of Honor
Kazuaki Okazaki, executed convicted murderer and former member of Aum Shinrikyo (Sakamoto family murder and Tokyo subway sarin attack)

External links

 Mine City official website 
 Yamaguchi Prefecture official website

References

Cities in Yamaguchi Prefecture